Morrisville is a village in the town of Morristown, Lamoille County, Vermont, United States. As of the 2020 census, the village population was 2,086. Morrisville has two country clubs, a hospital, a school featuring Greek architecture and an airport. Morrisville is the headquarters for Union Bank.

History
Morrisville was settled in 1798. The Morrisville Historic District is listed in the National Register of Historic Places. The hospital and one of the country clubs are named after Alexander Copley, a philanthropist who donated much of the money for their construction. Copley also donated a large sum of money for the construction of the town's high school that is currently called Peoples Academy.

Geography
Morrisville is in the northeastern part of the town of Morristown, slightly southeast of the center of Lamoille County. The village is on both sides of the Lamoille River, with the village center on the south side.

Climate

This climatic region is typified by large seasonal temperature differences, with warm to hot (and often humid) summers and cold (sometimes severely cold) winters.  According to the Köppen Climate Classification system, Morrisville has a humid continental climate, abbreviated "Dfb" on climate maps.

Demographics

As of the census of 2020, the population was 2,086 with 898 households. There were 1,123 housing units.

Culture

The Vermont Wild of the Federal Hockey League played out of Morrisville's Green Mountain Arena in the 2011-12 season, but they suspended operations after approximately two weeks. The Wild were the first professional hockey team to play in Vermont.

Points of interest
 Noyes House Museum
 Morrisville Depot

Education
 Morristown Elementary School
 Peoples Academy Middle Level
 Peoples Academy High School
 Bishop Marshall School—A private Catholic school accepting families of all faiths
 Community College of Vermont

Media

The News and Citizen is a weekly newspaper published since 1881. It was purchased in 2015 by the owners of the Stowe Reporter, who then created the Vermont Community Newspaper Group in January 2019.

Notable people 

 Chris Andrews, IT pioneer
 Frederick G. Fleetwood, U.S. congressman
 John Fusco, Hollywood screenwriter, author, and TV series creator
 Dewey K. Hickok, inventor of the washing machine
 Alban J. Parker, Vermont Attorney General
 Clifton G. Parker, Vermont Attorney General
 George M. Powers, Chief Justice of the Vermont Supreme Court
 H. Henry Powers, U.S. congressman
 Martha L. Poland Thurston (1849-1898), social leader, philanthropist, writer
 Maria von Trapp, inspiration for The Sound of Music; died in Morrisville (March 28, 1987)

References

Incorporated villages in Vermont
 Morrisville
Villages in Lamoille County, Vermont